Peter J. Abbate Jr. (born March 22, 1949) is a former American politician who represented District 49 in the New York State Assembly.

Abbate graduated from St. John's University and Bishop Ford Central Catholic High School.

First elected to the assembly in 1986, Abbate is the chair of the Committee on Governmental Employees, a position he has held since 2002, previously served as the chairman of the Committee on Real Property Taxation and the Committee on Cities.

Prior to his election to the Assembly, Abbate served as the district representative for former Congressman Stephen J. Solarz, from 1974 to 1985, and previously as his legislative assistant while Solarz was a member of the Assembly, 1973.

In 2022, Abbate was confronted by a local resident for removing lawn signs supporting Lee Zeldin from the ground in Midwood. Abbate said that the signs were breaking the law.

External links 
New York State Member Website
Abbate to head tax committee
Gotham Gazette's Eye On Albany: New York State Assembly: District 49
Biography: New York State Democratic Committee
Project Vote Smart: Interest Group Ratings

References

1949 births
Living people
Democratic Party members of the New York State Assembly
21st-century American politicians
St. John's University (New York City) alumni
Politicians from Brooklyn